The Infectious Disease Act is an Act of the Parliament of Finland.

Amendments 
On September 22, 2021, the Finnish Parliament voted to adopt an amendment to the Act, removing the "close contact" definition in Section 58d, a temporary provision that applied to public spaces in restaurants, stores, and other venues.

On October 15, 2021, the Parliament voted to amend the Act to adopt rules for using COVID-19 passports to access certain public spaces while COVID-19 restrictions are in force.

References 

COVID-19 pandemic in Finland